La Jolla is a small neighborhood in Placentia, California, in northern Orange County. Traditionally La Jolla has largely been made up of Hispanics, but does have Caucasian and a small portion of other races. This small neighborhood was once known as La Jolla Colony, Placentia and was not considered part of unincorporated Anaheim. Today, like the nearby community of Atwood, La Jolla is part of the City of Placentia. Since its construction, La Jolla has been bisected by the 57 Freeway, but connected by a traffic and pedestrian bridge over the freeway.

La Jolla was severely damaged in the Orange County flood of 1938 which destroyed almost every structure in the area with the exception of McFadden School, a small church, and about 7 blocks of homes.

La Jolla is primarily a residential area made up of older single-family homes and several apartment complexes. La Jolla does not have many businesses except for a couple of small independent neighborhood markets. The three main stores in the area are the Urdiano's Market on West La Jolla Street, Gonzales Market on the east side of the 57 freeway, and Pee Wee's Market on the west side. The Gonzales Market is believed to have been constructed shortly after the Orange County flood of 1936. Pee Wee's Market was opened around 1960 by the Magaña family, long-time residents of Placentia.

The corner of La Jolla Street and Melrose at the east end of the La Jolla Neighborhood was once the site of McFadden Elementary School. The School was torn down in the early 1980s, but recently a new school was built. The new school is known as Melrose Elementary School and the attached park is still known as McFadden Park.

Brent Liles, former bassist for Social Distortion, died on January 18, 2007, in La Jolla. He was struck by a truck as he rode his bicycle across a street.

References

External links
 City of Placentia official site

Placentia, California
Neighborhoods in Orange County, California